The South African Police Star for Outstanding Service was a decoration that existed between 1979 and 2004.

Instituted on 1 May 1979, the SOE took over the dual role previously played by the SA Police Star for Distinguished Service, and was awarded for particular gallantry, or for outstanding service, resourcefulness, leadership, or sense of responsibility and personal example.  It was discontinued as a gallantry decoration when the SA Police Cross for Bravery was expanded to three classes in 1989, but continued to be granted for outstanding service until it was superseded by the SA Police Service Gold Medal for Outstanding Service on 4 May 2004.

The SOE is a silver-gilt cross, the arms made up of multiple rays, with pointed rays between the arms.  In the centre is a stylised aloe plant.  The reverse displays the national coat of arms and the words .  Its ribbon is yellow, with green edges and a white-blue-white panel near each edge.

See also

 South African civil honours
 South African police decorations

References

 Alexander, E. G. M., Barron G. K. B. and Bateman, A. J. (1986).  South African Orders, Decorations and Medals.  Human and Rousseau.
 Monick, S. (1988).  Awards of the South African Uniformed Public Services 1912-1987.  South African National Museum of Military History.

External links
 

Law enforcement in South Africa
Police decorations and medals of South Africa
1979 establishments in South Africa
Awards established in 1979